The senatus consultum de Bacchanalibus ("senatorial decree concerning the Bacchanalia") is a notable Old Latin inscription dating to 186 BC. It was discovered in 1640 at Tiriolo, in Calabria, southern Italy. Published by the presiding praetor, it conveys the substance of a decree of the Roman Senate prohibiting the Bacchanalia throughout all Italy, except in certain special cases which must be approved specifically by the Senate.

When members of the elite began to participate, information was put before the Senate by Publius Aebutius and his lover and neighbour Hispala Faecenia, who was also a well-known prostitute, as told in the Ab Urbe Condita Libri of Livy. The cult was held to be a threat to the security of the state, investigators were appointed, rewards were offered to informants, legal processes were put in place and the Senate began the official suppression of the cult throughout Italy. According to the Augustan historian Livy, the chief historical source, many committed suicide to avoid indictment. The stated penalty for leadership was death. Livy stated that there were more executions than imprisonments. After the conspiracy had been quelled the Bacchanalia survived in southern Italy.

The Senatus consultum de Bacchanalibus can be seen as an example of realpolitik, a display of the Roman senate's authority to its Italian allies after the Second Punic War, and a reminder to any Roman politician, populist and would-be generalissimo that the Senate's collective authority trumped all personal ambition. Nevertheless, the extent and ferocity of the official response to the Bacchanalia was probably unprecedented, and betrays some form of moral panic on the part of Roman authorities; Burkert finds "nothing comparable in religious history before the persecutions of Christians".

Text

The surviving copy is inscribed on a bronze tablet discovered in Calabria in Southern Italy (1640), now at the Kunsthistorisches Museum in Vienna. The text as copied from the inscription is as follows.
 [Q] MARCIVS L F S POSTVMIVS L F COS SENATVM CONSOLVERVNT N OCTOB APVD AEDEM
 DVELONAI SC ARF M CLAVDI M F L VALERI P F Q MINVCI C F DE BACANALIBVS QVEI FOIDERATEI
 ESENT ITA EXDEICENDVM CENSVERE NEIQVIS EORVM BACANAL HABVISE VELET SEI QVES
 ESENT QVEI SIBEI DEICERENT NECESVS ESE BACANAL HABERE EEIS VTEI AD PR VRBANVM
 ROMAM VENIRENT DEQVE EEIS REBVS VBEI EORVM VER[B]A AVDITA ESENT VTEI SENATVS
 NOSTER DECERNERET DVM NE MINVS SENATOR[I]BVS C ADESENT [QVOM E]A RES COSOLORETVR
 BACAS VIR NEQVIS ADIESE VELET CEIVIS ROMANVS NEVE NOMINVS LATINI NEVE SOCIVM
 QVISQVAM NISEI PR VRBANVM ADIESENT ISQVE [D]E SENATVOS SENTENTIAD DVM NE
 MINVS SENATORIBVS C ADESENT QVOM EA RES COSOLERETVR IOVSISENT CE[N]SVERE
 SACERDOS NEQVIS VIR ESET MAGISTER NEQVE VIR NEQVE MVLIER QVISQVAM ESET
 NEVE PECVNIAM QVISQVAM EORVM COMOINE[M H]ABVISE VE[L]ET NEVE MAGISTRATVM
 NEVE PRO MAGISTRATVD NEQVE VIRVM [NEQVE MVL]IEREM QVISQVAM FECISE VELET
 NEVE POST HAC INTER SED CONIOVRA[SE NEV]E COMVOVISE NEVE CONSPONDISE
 NEVE CONPROMESISE VELET NEVE QVISQVAM FIDEM INTER SED DEDISE VELET
 SACRA IN OQVOLTOD NE QVISQVAM FECISE VELET NEVE IN POPLICOD NEVE IN
 PREIVATOD NEVE EXSTRAD VRBEM SACRA QVISQVAM FECISE VELET NISEI
 PR VRBANVM ADIESET ISQVE DE SENATVOS SENTENTIAD DVM NE MINVS
 SENATORIBVS C ADESENT QVOM EA RES COSOLERETVR IOVSISENT CENSVERE
 HOMINES PLOVS V OINVORSEI VIREI ATQVE MVLIERES SACRA NE QVISQVAM
 FECISE VELET NEVE INTER IBEI VIREI PLOVS DVOBVS MVLIERIBVS PLOVS TRIBVS
 ARFVISE VELENT NISEI DE PR VRBANI SENATVOSQVE SENTENTIAD VTEI SVPRAD
 SCRIPTVM EST HAICE VTEI IN COVENTIONID EXDEICATIS NE MINVS TRINVM
 NOVNDINVM SENATVOSQVE SENTENTIAM VTEI SCIENTES ESETIS EORVM
 SENTENTIA ITA FVIT SEI QVES ESENT QVEI ARVORSVM EAD FECISENT QVAM SVPRAD
 SCRIPTVM EST EEIS REM CAPVTALEM FACIENDAM CENSVERE ATQVE VTEI
 HOCE IN TABOLAM AHENAM INCEIDERETIS ITA SENATVS AIQVOM CENSVIT
 VTEIQVE EAM FIGIER IOVBEATIS VBI FACILVMED GNOSCIER POTISIT ATQVE
 VTEI EA BACANALIA SEI QVA SVNT EXSTRAD QVAM SEI QVID IBEI SACRI EST
 ITA VTEI SVPRAD SCRIPTVM EST IN DIEBVS X QVIBVS VOBEIS TABELAI DATAI
 ERVNT FACIATIS VTEI DISMOTA SIENT IN AGRO TEVRANO

Translation into classical Latin
The following passage uses classical reflexes of the Old Latin lexical items:

 [Quīntus] Mārcius L(ūciī) f(īlius), S(purius) Postumius L(ūciī) f(īlius) cō(n)s(ulēs) senātum cōnsuluērunt N(ōnīs) Octōb(ribus), apud aedem
 Bellōnae. Sc(rībendō) adf(uērunt) M(ārcus) Claudi(us) M(ārcī) f(īlius), L(ūcius) Valeri(us) P(ubliī) f(īlius), Q(uīntus) Minuci(us) C (=Gaiī) f(īlius). Dē Bacchānālibus quī foederātī
 essent, ita ēdīcendum cēnsuēre: «Nēquis eōrum [B]acchānal habuisse vellet. Sī quī
 essent, quī sibī dīcerent necesse esse Bacchānal habēre, eīs utī ad pr(aetōrem) urbānum
 Rōmam venīrent, dēque eīs rēbus, ubī eōrum v[e]r[b]a audīta essent, utī senātus
 noster dēcerneret, dum nē minus senatōr[i]bus C adessent, [cum e]a rēs cōnsulerētur.
 Bacchās vir nēquis adiisse vellet cīvis Rōmānus nēve nōminis Latīnī nēve sociōrum
 quisquam, nisi pr(aetōrem) urbānum adiissent, isque [d]ē senātūs sententiā, dum nē
 minus senātōribus C adessent, cum ea rēs cōnsulerētur, iussissent. Cēnsuēre.
 Sacerdōs nēquis vir esset; magister neque vir neque mulier quisquam esset.
 Nēve pecūniam quisquam eōrum commūne[m h]abuisse vellet; nēve magistrātum,
 nēve prō magistrātū, neque virum [neque mul]ierem qui[s]quam fecisse vellet,
 nēve posthāc inter sē coniūrās[se nēv]e convōvisse nēve cōnspondisse
 nēve comprōmīsisse vellet, nēve quisquam fidem inter sē dedisse vellet.
 Sacra in occultō nē quisquam fēcisse vellet. Nēve in publicō nēve in
 prīvātō nēve extrā urbem sacra quisquam fēcisse vellet, nisi
 pr(aetōrem) urbānum adiisset, isque dē senātūs sententiā, dum nē minus
 senatōribus C adessent, cum ea rēs cōnsulerētur, iussissent. Cēnsuēre.
 Hominēs plūs V ūniversī virī atque mulierēs sacra nē quisquam
 fēcisse vellet, nēve inter ibī virī plūs duōbus, mulieribus plūs tribus
 adfuisse vellent, nisi dē pr(aetōris) urbānī senātūsque sententiā, utī suprā
 scrīptum est.» Haec utī in cōntiōne ēdīcātis nē minus trīnum
 nūndinum, senātūsque sententiam utī scientēs essētis, eōrum
 sententia ita fuit: «Sī quī essent, quī adversum ea fēcissent, quam suprā
 scrīptum est, eīs rem capitālem faciendam cēnsuēre». Atque utī
 hoc in tabulam ahēnam incīderētis, ita senātus aequum cēnsuit,
 utīque eam fīgī iubeātis, ubī facillimē nōscī possit; atque
 utī ea Bacchānālia, sī quae sunt, extrā quam sī quid ibī sacrī est,
 (ita utī suprā scrīptum est) in diēbus X, quibus vōbīs tabellae datae
 erunt, faciātis utī dīmōta sint. In agrō Teurānō.

Orthography
The spelling of the text of the Senatus consultum differs in many predictable ways from the spelling of Classical Latin.  Some of these differences are merely orthographical; others reflect archaic pronunciations or other archaisms in the forms of words.

Geminate consonants
In Classical Latin, geminate (or long) consonants are consistently written with a sequence of two letters: e.g., cc, ll, ss for [kː], [lː], [sː]. These geminate consonants are not represented in the Senatus consultum:
C for cc in HOCE (26:1) hocce
C for cch in BACANALIBVS (2:17) Bacchānālibus, BACANAL (3:7, 4:7) Bacchānal, BACAS (7:1) Bacchās, BACANALIA (28:3) Bacchānālia. The h was probably not pronounced.
L for ll in DVELONAI (2:1) Bellōnae, VELET (3:9 et passim) vellet, VELENT (21:2) vellent, FACILVMED (27:6) facillimē, TABELAI (29:11) tabellae
M for mm in COMOINE[M] (11:5) commūnem
Q for cc in OQVOLTOD (15:3) occultō
S for ss in ADESENT (6:8, 9:4, 18:3) adessent, ADIESE (7:4) adiisse, ADIESENT (8:5) adiissent, ADIESET (17:3) adiisset, ARFVISE (21:1) adfuisse, COMVOVISE (13:8) convōvisse, CONPROMESISE (14:2) comprōmīsisse, CONSPONDISE (13:10) conspondisse, DEDISE (14:9) dedisse, ESE (4:6), ESENT (3:1, 4:1, 5:10, 24:6) essent, ESET (10:4, 10:11), ESETIS (23:6) essētis, FECISE (12:9, 15:6, 16:7, 20:1) fēcisse, FECISENT (24:10) fēcissent, HABVISE (3:8) habuisse, IOVSISENT (9:9) iussissent, NECESVS (4:5) necessus.

Consonant clusters
Archaic gn- is found for n- at the beginning of the verb nosco
GNOSCIER (27:7) noscī.
The prefix ad appears as AR before V and F:
 ARVORSVM adversum (24:8), ARFVISE (21:1) adfuisse, and ARF[VERVNT] (2:3) adfuērunt.
The consonants bl appear as PL in POPLICOD publicō (15:10), recalling its origin from populus.

Diphthongs
AI is usually used instead of Classical ae in:
DVELONAI (2:1) Bellōnae, HAICE (22:3) haec, AIQVOM (26:8) aequum and TABELAI DATAI (29:11-12) tabellae datae. But AE is found in AEDEM (1:15).
EI became Classical ī in:
QVEI (2:18, 4:2, 24:7) quī, SEI (3:10, 24:4, 28:4,9) sī, VIREI (19:5, 20:6) virī, CEIVIS (7:6) cīvis, DEICERENT (4:4) dīcerent, EXDEICATIS (22:7) ēdīcātis, EXDEICENDVM (3:3) ēdīcendum, INCEIDERETIS (26:5) incīderētis, PREIVATOD prīvātō (16:1), EEIS (4:9, 5:4, 25:3) eīs, VOBEIS (29:10) vōbīs, FOIDERATEI (2:19) foederātī, OINVORSEI (19:4) ūniversī
EI at the end of a word often corresponds to Classical short i or to no vowel at all. However, in many cases such as sibī, utī, archaizing Classical forms ending in ī are also found, especially in poetry.
IBEI (20:5, 28:11) ibi, NISEI (8:2, 16:9, 21:3) nisi, SIBEI (4:3) sibi, VBEI ubi (5:6), VTEI ut (4:10 et passim), VTEIQVE (27:1) utque.
OV normally became Classical ū in:
CONIOVRA[SE] (13:6) coniūrāsse, NOVNDINVM (23:1) nūndinum, PLOVS (19:2, 20:7,10) plūs. Classical iubeātis and iussissent for IOVBEATIS (27:4) and IOVSISENT (9:9, 18:8) show the influence of the participle iussus, with regular short u in the stem.
OI normally became Classical ū in:
COMOINE[M] (11:5) commūnem, OINVORSEI (19:4) ūniversī
OI exceptionally became Classical oe in:
FOIDERATEI (2:19) foederātī

Short vowels
VO occurs instead of Classical Latin ve in ARVORSVM (24:8) adversum and OINVORSEI (19:4) ūniversī.
OL occurs instead of Classical Latin ul in COSOLERETVR (6:12) cōnsulerētur, CONSOLVERVNT (1:11) cōnsuluērunt, TABOLAM (26:3) tabulam and OQVOLTOD (15:3) occultō.
OM occurs instead of Classical Latin um in QVOM (18:4) cum and AIQVOM (26:8) aequum.
O occurs instead of Classical Latin u in POPLICOD publicō
V occurs instead of Classical Latin i in FACILVMED (27:6) facillimē and CAPVTALEM capitālem.  The spelling of CAPVTALEM recalls its origin from the noun caput.  The ending -umus for -imus occurs frequently in archaic Classical Latin texts; the vowel represented interchangeably by u and i may have been a central vowel distinct in sound from both. Possibly OINVORSEI (19:4) ūniversī belongs here too, if one may read it as oinu(v)orsei.

Archaisms
The archaic ending -ce added to some forms of the pronoun hic is reduced to -c in Classical Latin in most cases:
 HAICE (22:3) haec and HOCE (26:1) hoc
The ending -d, found on some adverbs and ablative singulars of nouns and pronouns, is lost in Classical Latin:
Adverbs SVPRAD (21:10, 24:12, 29:3) suprā, EXSTRAD (16:3, 28:7) extrā, FACILVMED (27:6) facillimē.
Ablatives EAD (24:9) eā, SED (13:5, 14:8) sē, COVENTIONID (22:6) cōntiōne, MAGISTRATVD magistrātū (12:3), OQVOLTOD (15:3) occultō, POPLICOD publicō (15:10), PREIVATOD prīvātō (16:1), SENTENTIAD (8:9, 17:7, 21:8) sententiā.
The last two words AGRO TEVRANO (30:7-8) omit the final -d, despite containing the same ablative ending elsewhere written -OD; this fact suggests that at the time of writing, the final -d was no longer pronounced in ordinary speech.

In Classical Latin the prefixes ex- and dis- become ē- and dī- before voiced consonants. In the Senatus consultum, they are still written EX and DIS:
EXDEICENDVM (3:3) ēdīcendum, EXDEICATIS ēdīcātis (22:7), and DISMOTA (30:4) dīmōta.

Archaic morpheme variants
The archaic passive infinitive ending -ier (instead of Classical -ī) is used
FIGIER (27:3) fīgī, GNOSCIER (27:7) noscī.
The archaic third-declension genitive singular ending -us (instead of Classical -is) is used in NOMINVS (7.9) (instead of nōminis). The ending -us comes from the Indo-European genitive singular ending *-os, the o-grade variant of the genitive singular suffix for consonant-stem nouns (while Classical -is comes from the e-grade variant *-es of the same suffix).

Translation into English
The inscription was translated by Nina E. Weston as follows.

"The Consuls Quintus Marcius, the son of Lucius, and Spurius Postumius, the son of Lucius, consulted the senate on the Nones of October (7th), at the temple of the Bellona. Marcus Claudius, son of Marcus, Lucius Valerius, son of Publius, and Quintus Minucius, son of Gaius, were the committee for drawing up the report. Regarding the Bacchanalia, it was resolved to give the following directions to those who are in alliance with us: No one of them is to possess a place where the festivals of Bacchus are celebrated; if there are any who claim that it is necessary for them to have such a place, they are to come to Rome to the praetor urbanus, and the senate is to decide on those matters, when their claims have been heard, provided that not less than 100 senators are present when the affair is discussed. No man is to be a Bacchantian, neither a Roman citizen, nor one of the Latin name, nor any of our allies unless they come to the praetor urbanus, and he in accordance with the opinion of the senate expressed when not less than 100 senators are present at the discussion, shall have given leave. Carried. No man is to be a priest; no one, either man or woman, is to be an officer (to manage the temporal affairs of the organization); nor is anyone of them to have charge of a common treasury; no one shall appoint either man or woman to be master or to act as master; henceforth they shall not form conspiracies among themselves, stir up any disorder, make mutual promises or agreements, or interchange pledges; no one shall observe the sacred rites either in public or private or outside the city, unless he comes to the praetor urbanus, and he, in accordance with the opinion of the senate, expressed when no less than 100 senators are present at the discussion, shall have given leave. Carried. No one in a company of more than five persons altogether, men and women, shall observe the sacred rites, nor in that company shall there be present more than two men or three women, unless in accordance with the opinion of the praetor urbanus and the senate as written above. See that you declare it in the assembly (contio) for not less than three market days; that you may know the opinion of the senate this was their judgment: if there are any who have acted contrary to what was written above, they have decided that a proceeding for a capital offense should be instituted against them; the senate has justly decreed that you should inscribe this on a brazen tablet, and that you should order it to be placed where it can be easiest read; see to it that the revelries of Bacchus, if there be any, except in case there be concerned in the matter something sacred, as was written above, be disbanded within ten days after this letter shall be delivered to you. In the Teuranian field."

See also
 List of Roman laws
 Roman Senate

Notes

External links
 
 
 
 
 Matthias Riedl, "The Containment of Dionysos: Religion and Politics in the Bacchanalia Affair of 186 BCE," International Political Anthropology 5 (2012) No. 2, pp. 113–133.

2nd century BC in the Roman Republic
2nd-century BC inscriptions
Roman law
Latin inscriptions